In Greek mythology, Alseids (Ἀλσηΐδες) were the nymphs of glens and groves. Of the Classical writers, the first and perhaps only poet to reference alseids is Homer. Rather than alseid he used the spelling alsea. The three uses of alsea by Homer are as follows:"The nymphs who live in the lovely groves (ἄλσεα - alsea), and the springs of rivers (πηγαὶ ποταμῶν - pegai potamon) and the grassy meadows (πίσεα ποιήεντα - pisea poiëenta)."

"They [nymphs] come from springs (krênai), they come from groves (alsea), they come from the sacred rivers (ποταμοί - potamoi) flowing seawards."

"The nymphs [of Mount Ida] who haunt the pleasant woods (alsea), or of those who inhabit this lovely mountain (ὄρος - oros) and the springs of rivers (pegai potamon) and grassy meads (pisea)."

Notes

References 

 Homer, The Iliad with an English Translation by A.T. Murray, Ph.D. in two volumes. Cambridge, MA., Harvard University Press; London, William Heinemann, Ltd. 1924. . Online version at the Perseus Digital Library.
 Homer, Homeri Opera in five volumes. Oxford, Oxford University Press. 1920. . Greek text available at the Perseus Digital Library.
 Homer, The Odyssey with an English Translation by A.T. Murray, PH.D. in two volumes. Cambridge, MA., Harvard University Press; London, William Heinemann, Ltd. 1919. . Online version at the Perseus Digital Library. Greek text available from the same website.
 The Homeric Hymns and Homerica with an English Translation by Hugh G. Evelyn-White. Homeric Hymns. Cambridge, MA.,Harvard University Press; London, William Heinemann Ltd. 1914. Online version at the Perseus Digital Library. Greek text available from the same website.

Nymphs